Mark Bowden (born 1951) is an American journalist and author.

Mark Bowden also refers to:

Mark Bowden (composer) (born 1979), British classical composer
Mark Bowden (UN official), British humanitarian and disaster relief worker
Mark Bowden (English author) (born 1970), British body language expert